Matthew of Westminster, long regarded as the author of the Flores Historiarum, is now thought never to have existed.

The error was first discovered in 1826 by Francis Turner Palgrave, who said that Matthew was "a phantom who never existed," and later the truth of this statement was completely proved by Henry Richards Luard. The name appears to have been taken from that of Matthew Paris, from whose Chronica majora the earlier part of the work was mainly copied, and from Westminster Abbey, where the work was partially written.

He is sometimes surnamed Florilegus (literally "flower-gatherer"), in reference to the title of his supposed work.

References

Attribution

Medieval English writers